Ngoyi is a surname. Notable people with the surname include:

Elie Ngoyi (born 1988), Canadian football player
Emomo Eddy Ngoyi (born 1993), Congolese footballer
Granddi Ngoyi (born 1988), Congolese-French footballer
Lillian Ngoyi (1911–1980), South African activist

See also
Ngozi (disambiguation)